Jamelle Renee Elliott  (born May 18, 1974) is an American women's basketball coach, formerly at the University of Cincinnati women's basketball team.

Early life and high school
Elliott was introduced to basketball by her cousin Adrien Elliott, who Elliott looked up to as a youngster.  Adrien went to H.D. Woodson High School in Washington DC.  Elliott attended summer camp one year with Adrien, and became interested in the game.  She joined her junior high school basketball team, and also joined an Amateur Athletic Union team. Jamelle wanted to follow her cousin to Woodson and get the best basketball experience so she enrolled at Woodson and traveled almost an hour-and-a-half drive each way to school  "I used basketball as my way to hopefully go to college, and it worked out.”
While at Woodson her basketball team won two consecutive state championships.  Jamelle also had individual success, earning Scholar-Athlete honors, as well as being named to the Washington Post All-Metro Team.

College
Jamelle played basketball in the summer leagues at Georgetown University.  One day Geno Auriemma walked in and liked what he saw.  Geno recruited Jamelle to play for him at Connecticut.  Jamelle had other colleges recruiting her like Georgetown University, Syracuse University, Temple University, and George Washington University but she eventually chose UConn.  Jamelle played in 135 games in her UConn career, having an overall record of 117–18 (.867) and never missing a game in her four years. In her junior season the Huskies went undefeated (35–0) and won the 1995 NCAA National Championship over the Tennessee Lady Vols, starting the decade rivalry between the two teams.  She finished her UConn career with 1,387 points and is ranked No. 7 among UConn's all-time rebounding leaders (1,054). Auriemma would say about her, "I've coached a lot of bright players, but Jamelle is the smartest and the toughest".

After college
After graduating from UConn with a bachelor's degree in Business Administration, Elliott took the following year off from sports, and pursued her master's degree in Sports Management with an interest in some day becoming an athletic director of a college.  She was also given an opportunity to work in UConn’s business office as a graduate assistant, a great way to gain experience. After taking a year off she began to miss basketball.  The next year she accepted an assistant coaching job at Connecticut.  She held the assistant coaching position for 12 seasons.  The 2002 team was one of the memorable teams along with the 1995 team in UConn history.  The 2002 team was the second UConn team to have a perfect record. Elliott put the pressure on the 2002 team to match her 1995 team, and try to be undefeated to motivate them, and it worked.  Tamika Williams (a player on the 2002 team) quipped, "Jamelle used to tell us that we never really won a national championship until we went undefeated. She always used to rub that in our faces. But that night we ran to her and rubbed it in her face."

Elliott was also an assistant coach on the 2009 team that went undefeated 39–0.

Cincinnati Bearcats
On May 5, 2009, she achieved her goal of becoming a head coach by taking the Cincinnati Bearcats women's basketball job. She was UC women's head coach for nine seasons.
“I’d like the opportunity to turn a program around or make it better like Coach Auriemma has done with his basketball program at UConn." 

Elliott was previously a candidate for jobs at Fairfield, George Washington and Penn State.

On May 18, 2009 Marisa Moseley, an assistant coach at the University of Minnesota and former Boston University player was hired to replace Elliott as assistant coach for the Huskies.

In March of 2018, Elliott was fired after nine seasons. Elliott was 113–162 during that time, but was coming off a 19–13 season in which the Bearcats played in the WNIT.

University of Connecticut statistics

Huskies of Honor induction

On December 29, 2013, the University of Connecticut inducted two women's basketball team, the National Championship winning teams of 2002–03 and 2003–04 into the Huskies of Honor. Elliot was an assistant coach for each of those two seasons.

Head coaching record

See also
 List of Connecticut Huskies women's basketball players with 1000 points
 List of Connecticut Huskies women's basketball players with 1000 rebounds

Notes

References

External links
 UConn Huskies bio

1974 births
Living people
American women's basketball coaches
American women's basketball players
Basketball coaches from Washington, D.C.
Basketball players from Washington, D.C.
Cincinnati Bearcats women's basketball coaches
H. D. Woodson High School alumni
UConn Huskies women's basketball coaches
UConn Huskies women's basketball players